Znojmo is a town in the South Moravian Region of the Czech Republic. It has about 33,000 inhabitants. Znojmo is the historical and cultural centre of southwestern Moravia and the second most populated town in the South Moravian Region. The historical centre of Znojmo is well preserved and is protected by law as an urban monument reservation.

Administrative parts
Villages of Derflice, Kasárna, Konice, Mramotice, Načeratice, Oblekovice, Popice and Přímětice are administrative parts of Znojmo.

Geography

Located near the border with Austria, it is connected to Vienna by railway and road.

History

A fortress at the site possibly already existed during the time of the Great Moravian Empire in the 9th century. From about 1055, Znojmo Castle served as the residence of a Přemyslid principality within the Bohemian March of Moravia and a strategically important outpost near the border with the Bavarian March of Austria in the south. In 1101, Luitpold of Znojmo, Duke of Moravia, built the Rotunda of St. Catherine in the castle.

The Znojmo Castle was seized and demolished by Duke Vladislaus II of Bohemia in 1145. In 1190, Duke Conrad II founded the Premonstratensian Louka Abbey at Znojmo, which became the centre for settlement of German-speaking immigrants, as part of the medieval Ostsiedlung movement.

The first written mention of Znojmo is from 1226. The royal town of Znojmo was founded shortly before 1226 by King Ottokar I of Bohemia on the plains in front of the rebuilt castle and was fortified. It was the first royal town on Moravia.

The town survived the Hussite Wars unscathed, and prospered. In the 15th and 16th centuries, networks of burgher houses with a system of underground passages were built as a part of fortifications. The Renaissance and late Gothic houses are preserved to this day. The development ended with the Thirty Years' War. Znojmo was conquered and ransacked repeatedly. It took over a hundred years for the town to recover.

From the 19th century, Znojmo is best known as the site for the Armistice of Znaim concluded there on 12 July 1809 after the Battle of Znaim, following the decisive Battle of Wagram, between Emperor Napoleon and the archduke Charles, which had taken place seven days earlier.

Since the end of World War I, Znojmo was within the newly established state of Czechoslovakia, except for 1938–1945 during the Nazi German occupation when it was included in Reichsgau Niederdonau. The German population of the town were expelled in 1945 under the Beneš decrees.

Demographics

Economy
Znojmo is famous for local production of cucumbers, pickled in the original sweet-sour and spicy pickle, whose cultivation in the Znojmo region was introduced in 1571 by the Louka monastery Abbot George II. The special taste is also the result of local type of cucumbers, cultivation method, soil, climatic conditions, processing and also the packaging in which they are kept.

Thanks to the favorable climatic conditions, the town is also successful in winery and fruit growing. It is the centre of viticulture of the Znojmo wine sub-region.

Transport
There is a railway station where railway lines divide into three directions: Břeclav, Okříšky, and Retz.

Culture

Znojmo is known for its Znojmo Vintage Festival which takes place every September. The main attraction of the festival is the historical parade commemorating the visit of King John of Bohemia to Znojmo in 1327. 

The annual Cucumber Feast is dedicated to tradition of growing cucumbers in the region.

Sport
1. SC Znojmo FK is a local football club competing in the Moravian–Silesian Football League (3rd tier of the Czech football league system).

Orli Znojmo is an ice hockey club playing in the Czech 2. Liga.

Sights

The Gothic Church of St. Nicholas and the late Gothic Town Hall tower are the most recognizable landmarks. The original church was founded in around 1100, and replaced by a new church gradually built from 1338 until the late 15th century.

Overlooking the Thaya River valley, on the edge of the medieval city, there is the Znojmo Castle, dating back to 11th century, founded by the Přemyslid dukes. The only remains of the castle used by the Přemysl dukes is the Romanesque Rotunda of Saint Catherine, the interior of which is covered with 11th-century frescoes depicting scenes from the Bible and illustrating the life of Přemysl the Ploughman.

Beneath the grounds of the old town, there is a vast labyrinth of connected passageways and cellars, Znojmo Catacombs, developed in the 14th and 15th centuries for defence purposes, containing wells, drainage, fireplaces, trap doors and escapeways that led beyond the fortifications of the town.

The Church of Saint Michael the Archangel was probably built in the 12th century. It is the second most significant church in the town after Church of Saint Nicholas. The church was first mentioned in 1226 and completely rebuilt in the late Gothic style in 1508. It is considered a monument of national importance.

Notable people

Sigismund, Holy Roman Emperor (1368–1437), king of Bohemia; died here
Prokop Diviš (1698–1765), inventor, catholic priest; served here in 1736–1741
Clement Mary Hofbauer, C.Ss.R. (1751–1820), Redemptorist priest and saint; served here as an apprentice baker in 1767–1770
Charles Sealsfield (1793–1864), German-American writer and lawyer
Hugo Lederer (1871–1940), sculptor
Otte Wallish (1903–1977), Israeli graphic designer
Anna Spitzmüller (1903–2001), art historian and curator
Edith Körner (1921–2000), British magistrate
Franz Woidich (1921–2004), German fighter pilot
Petr Rosol (born 1964), ice hockey player
Jitka Schneiderová (born 1973), actress
Květoslav Svoboda (born 1982), swimmer
Michal Ordoš (born 1983), footballer
Jiří Orság (born 1989), weightlifter
Jiří Procházka (born 1992), mixed martial artist
Andrea Stašková (born 2000), footballer

Twin towns – sister cities

Znojmo is twinned with: 

 Chrudim, Czech Republic
 Nové Zámky, Slovakia
 Pontassieve, Italy
 Povo (Trento), Italy
 Retz, Austria
 Ružinov (Bratislava), Slovakia
 Strzegom, Poland
 Torgau, Germany
 Villazzano (Trento), Italy

References

External links

 
Populated places in Znojmo District
Cities and towns in the Czech Republic
1226 establishments in Europe